The chief executive of NHS England is the head of the National Health Service in England, and is a senior medical management adviser to the Government of the United Kingdom. The chief executive directs the governing body of the NHS, and is the highest-ranking member of the Health Service's board. There have been nine chief executives of NHS England since the post was established in 1985, following the report and recommendation of Roy Griffiths. 

 Victor Paige 1985–1986 (1.5 years, as chair)
 Len Peach  1986–1989 (3 years)
 Duncan Nichol 1989–1994 (5 years)
 Alan Langlands 1994–2000 (6 years)
 Nigel Crisp 1 November 2000 – 6 March 2006. (5.5 years)
 Ian Carruthers 7 March 2006 – September 2006 (interim for 6 months)
 David Nicholson September 2006 – 31 March 2014 (6.5 years at the Department of Health and 1 year at NHS England)
 Simon Stevens 1 April 2014 – 31 July 2021 (7.3 years)
 Amanda Pritchard 1 August 2021 – present

From 1985 until 2013 the NHS Executive and its predecessor bodies formed part of England's Department of Health and Social Care. 

Since April 2013 NHS England has been an independent statutory body. It has been argued that NHS England's independence gives the Chief Executive 'the potential to be a prominent national figure able to speak on behalf of the NHS'.

Its clinicians, managers and health experts are employed as public officials not as civil servants.

References

National Health Service
Chief executive officers